Rank comparison chart of air forces of Oceanian states.

Officers

See also
Air force officer rank insignia

References

Oceania
Air force ranks
Military comparisons